Dr. Hamid Khan Achakzai is a Pakistani politician from Balochistan affiliated with the Pakhtunkhwa Milli Awami Party . He is a son of the Pashtun nationalist leader Abdul Samad Khan Achakzai. His elder brother Muhammad Khan Achakzai is the former Governor of Balochistan while his other elder brother, Mahmood Khan Achakzai, is a veteran politician and leader of Pakhtunkhwa Milli Awami Party .

In the general election of 1993, Hamid Khan Achakzai was elected into the National Assembly of Pakistan from the NA-198 constituency, serving as a parliamentarian until the end of the assembly's tenure in 1996. He later also became a member of the Provincial Assembly of Balochistan in 1999.

His nephew Abdul Majeed Khan Achakzai is also a politician, serving as a member of the Balochistan provincial assembly from 2002 to 2007 and elected Again in General elections of 2013 as MPA from provincial constituency PB-13 .

References

Living people
Hamid
Balochistan MPAs 1997–1999
Pashtunkhwa Milli Awami Party politicians
Pashtun people
People from Killa Abdullah District
People from Quetta
Year of birth missing (living people)